Jipyeong Station is a station on the Gyeongui-Jungang Line in Gyeonggi-do, South Korea. It is the eastern terminus of the commuter railway, running from Seoul to Yangpyeong County. Mugunghwa-ho trains also stop at this station. It was originally built in 1940 and serves the Gyeongui–Jungang Line of the Seoul Metropolitan Subway since 2017.

References

External links

Railway stations in Gyeonggi Province
Metro stations in Yangpyeong County
Seoul Metropolitan Subway stations
Railway stations opened in 1939